Liu Songbo (Chinese: 刘松博; born 1 April 1993 in Jilin) is a Chinese male short track speed skater. Representing China, he participated in both 2009 and 2010 World Junior Short Track Speed Skating Championships, and ranked 15th and 4th respectively (overall ranking). He won the gold medal for 500 meters in 2011 World Junior Championships, as well as a gold medal in 2011 Winter Universiade for men's 5000 meter relay race.

References

External links
 

1993 births
Living people
Chinese male short track speed skaters
Universiade medalists in short track speed skating
Universiade gold medalists for China
Competitors at the 2011 Winter Universiade
21st-century Chinese people